Tocancipá is a municipality and town of Colombia in the Central Savanna Province, part of the department of Cundinamarca. Tocancipá borders Gachancipá and Nemocón in the north, Zipaquirá in the west, Guasca and Guatavita in the east and Guasca and Sopó in the south.

Etymology 
The name Tocancipá comes from Muysccubun and means "Valley of the joys of the zipa".

History 
The area of Tocancipá was inhabited early in the history of inhabitation of the Altiplano. The archaeological site Tibitó is located within the boundaries of Tocancipá and evidence of inhabitation has been dated to 11,740 ± 110 years BP. At the time of arrival of the Spanish conquistadores in 1537, Tocancipá was part of the Muisca Confederation, a loose confederation of different rulers of the Muisca. The zipa of Bacatá ruled over Tocancipá.

Modern Tocancipá was founded on September 21, 1593 by Miguel de Ibarra.

Tourism 
Jaime Duque Park, a family-oriented amusement park, is located in Tocancipá. The town also hosts the Autódromo de Tocancipá, a race track where vintage and GT races are held.

Gallery

References

Bibliography 
 

Municipalities of Cundinamarca Department
Populated places established in 1593
1593 establishments in the Spanish Empire
Muisca Confederation
Muysccubun